The Virgin Islands Party (VIP) is a political party in the British Virgin Islands.  It is presently led by Acting Premier Natalio Wheatley.  It is the oldest active political party in the British Virgin Islands, and it has won more general elections (seven) than any other political party in the British Virgin Islands.

The party was founded by Lavity Stoutt in 1971 when Stoutt left the United Party in order to contest 1971 election after a dispute with Conrad Maduro as to who should be leader of the United Party.  The Virgin Islands Party led by Stoutt lost to coalitions led by Willard Wheatley in the 1971 and 1975 general elections, but triumphed in the 1979 general election.  Stoutt continued to lead the party until his death in 1995.  After Stoutt's death, leadership of the party fell to Ralph T. O'Neal who led it until he stepped down on 28 May 2014.

Prior to the 2011 general election the Virgin Islands Party had held power in the British Virgin Islands (BVI) for all except for 15 years since the adoption of the modern Legislative Council in 1967.  Between its foundation in 1971 and 2014, the party had only two leaders: Lavity Stoutt and Ralph O'Neal; these two party leaders are also the two longest serving elected politicians in BVI history and the first two leaders of the territory to have served more than two terms as either Chief Minister or Premier.  On 28 May 2014 Julian Fraser took over from Ralph O'Neal, and led the party to defeat in the 2015 general election.  On 30 November 2016 Andrew Fahie replaced Julian Fraser as party leader, making Fraser the first (and, so far, the only) leader of the Virgin Islands Party not to ascend to either the Chief Minister or Premiership.

The party most recently held power after the 2019 general election held on 25 February 2019 winning 8 seats out of 13.

Virgin Islands Party had held power continuously from 1986 until 2003, winning four consecutive general elections, which is the longest unbroken streak in government for a political party in the British Virgin Islands.

Electoral history

House of Assembly elections

References 

Political parties in the British Virgin Islands
Political parties established in 1971
1971 establishments in the British Virgin Islands
Conservative parties in British Overseas Territories